The 1947 UCI Track Cycling World Championships were the World Championship for track cycling. They took place in Paris, France from 26 July to 3 August 1947. Five events for men were contested, 3 for professionals and 2 for amateurs.

Medal summary

Medal table

See also
 1947 UCI Road World Championships

References

Track cycling
UCI Track Cycling World Championships by year
International cycle races hosted by France
Uci
1947 in track cycling